Atlas may refer to a number of sailing ships;

 , a 435-ton merchant ship built in South Shields in 1801, that transported convicts to Port Jackson in 1802 and 1819. She was wrecked outside Pulicat, India on 9 May 1820.
 , a 547-ton merchant ship built in Quebec in 1801, that transported convicts to Port Jackson in 1802.
 , a 501-ton merchant ship built in Whitby in 1811, that transported convicts to Port Jackson in 1816 and disappeared in 1817.
, was launched at Kingston upon Hull as an East Indiaman. She made nine voyages to India or China for the British East India Company (EIC) before she was sold in 1831 for breaking up.

See also

Ship names